The Victorian of the Year is an award given to the most outstanding Victorian in any given year. The Victorian of the Year is awarded in Melbourne by the Victoria Day Council as part of Victoria Day celebrations on 1 July annually.

The Victoria Day Awards are made by public nomination and selected by the Awards Committee and ratified by the Trustees of the Victoria Day Council. The Victoria Day Awards are nominated and voted by Victorians.

The Victorian of the Year should not be confused with the Victorian winner of Australian of the Year, awarded in Canberra by the Australia Day Council as part of Australia Day celebrations on 26 January annually. The same people may be winners of both awards.

Other awards in the same series include the Young Victorian of the Year, Organisation of the Year, Good Corporate Citizen, the Arts Award and Local Achiever.

List of winners
The following individuals and organisations have been recipients in various classes under the Victoria Day Awards:

See also

 Australian of the Year

References

External links
 Victoria Day Council

Lists of award winners
Victorian